Panic Button is a British independent film released in 2011. The film is a horror thriller, intended as a cautionary tale on the dangers of online social networking.

Plot
Four young people win the  competition of a lifetime; Jo (Scarlett Alice Johnson), Max (Jack Gordon), Gwen (Elen Rhys) and Dave (Michael Jibson) head off on an all expenses paid trip to New York, courtesy of the social network All2gethr.com. As they board the private jet, they are asked to relinquish their mobile phones and take part in the in-flight entertainment – a new online gaming experience. An animated alligator on-screen asks them a series of personal questions that they are supposed to answer truthfully. The alligator then reveals the embarrassing lies they have told.

The next round of questions reveals even more lies about their sexual pasts, which the alligator says have been tracked through their All2gether accounts. When Dave refuses to continue and Max tries unsuccessfully to send an email for help, the screen shows them apparently live footage of friends being tortured and killed. They are all then told to come one at a time to the plane's bathroom to be given an individual task. They are shown someone close to them and told that if they fail in the task that person will die. They have 45 minutes to complete the tasks, after which the plane will be crashed and they will all die. Max reveals that he is not actually Max, he hacked into Max's account to take the prize. Dave and Max fight, and Max kills Dave. They are shown Max's brother having an arm cut off and Dave's fiancée being killed by the alligator. Jo gives Max wine, which he drinks.

Gwen tries to seduce Max in the bathroom, as this is now her task. Max realises the plane's hold adjoins the bathroom, and starts to break through with an axe. Gwen tries to stop him and Jo breaks her neck. Gwen's sister is shown being set alight. Max breaks through into the hold and finds the bodies of their friends - they have been watching recordings of them being killed. Max finds his laptop and attempts to get help, but the pilot demands the laptop from him, and destroys it. Jo and Max scuffle with the pilot. Max starts to feel ill; as he dies Jo reveals that she has poisoned him with the wine as her task. Jo and the pilot stand off and the alligator demands he goes back into the cockpit or else his family will die. Jo tries to convince him that they are already dead. Before he goes back into the cockpit, he tazes Jo. She eventually comes back around.

Jo, as the only survivor, is shown a video of a girl, Lucy Turner, committing suicide. The alligator reveals that all four of them had watched the video and made disparaging comments about it rather than trying to save her. He is going to release the video of their ordeal and tells Jo he harmed her daughter. With 6 minutes to impact, Jo runs to the exit of the plane and manages to open the plug door, getting sucked out of the plane just before it crashes into the sea. News reporters talk about the wreckage, confirming the video went viral. Jo's daughter, Sophie, is shown with the man who was the alligator. He introduces himself as Rupert Turner. and tells her that she is no longer Sophie, but Lucy. The film ends with them walking away hand in hand.

Cast
Scarlett Alice Johnson as Jo
Jack Gordon as Max
Michael Jibson as Dave
Elen Rhys as Gwen
Joshua Richards as Alligator/ Rupert Turner
Vern Raye as Callahan
Kezia Burrows as Newsreader
Sarah Parks as Annie Turner
Millie Midwinter as Lucy Turner
David Morgan as Man with Suitcases

Release
The film has been screened at the London FrightFest Film Festival and at the Cannes Film Festival. Panic Button was released onto DVD and Blu-ray on 7 November 2011.

Reception
Critical reception for the film was mixed. HorrorNews.net said the film was "damn scary". Dread Central criticized the movie's "undercooked climax and frankly preposterous final scene", but praised the film's acting and directing. Bloody Disgusting called the movie "a lame cyber-bullying metaphor disguised as a mildly diverting Brit B-flick."

References

External links
 
 all2gethr.com social network website
 
 

2011 films
2011 horror films
British horror films
British thriller films
British aviation films
2010s English-language films
2010s British films